General elections were held in Morocco on 27 September 2002. The elections were the first since King Mohammed VI of Morocco had come to the throne in 1999 and international observers saw it as a test of his commitment to democracy. The election saw an Islamist party the Justice and Development Party make strong gains but the outgoing government kept a majority in the Assembly of Representatives.

Campaign
The election took place under a revised voting system in which 325 deputies were elected from 91 constituencies. The new rules guaranteed women would be at least 10% of the Assembly of Representatives by reserving 30 seats for them. In total 5,865 candidates from 26 political parties and 5 lists of independents stood in the election including 965 female candidates. With many voters illiterate, each party had different symbols such as a car, alarm clock, horse, wasp or lamp which were printed on the ballot paper for voters to select.

Even the prime minister, Abderrahmane Youssoufi, agreed that previous elections in Morocco had been rigged but the new King Mohammed VI had pledged that this election should be kept free. Indeed, observers at polling stations reported that the election was much cleaner than previous elections. The campaign itself was low key with a low turnout expected. Issues raised in the campaign included rising prices, a salary freeze, economic stability and improvements in education and public health. Poverty and unemployment, combined with the powers which the King had reserved to himself meant many people saw little reason to vote.

The only Islamist party to stand in the election, the Justice and Development Party, did not stand in all of the seats to ensure it would not provoke violence such as had occurred in neighbouring Algeria after the 1991 election. They supported the introduction of Islamic law but pledged to work within the existing political system. The banned Islamist group Al Adl Wa Al Ihssane was seen as being the popular group in the country but called on supporters to boycott the election as they said it would achieve nothing.

Results
The results saw the Justice and Development Party make strong gains and over doubled its vote share to become the third largest party in parliament. However the parties that made up the previous coalition kept a strong majority in the legislature with the Socialist Union of Popular Forces remaining the largest party. Women won 35 seats in the legislature, a big increase from the two who had been elected in the 1997 election.

Following the election King Mohammed VI appointed the interior minister Driss Jettou as prime minister and a new government was formed with roughly the same political parties supporting the coalition as before the election.

References

Morocco
Elections in Morocco
General election
Moroccan general election